Adams Crossroads may refer to:

Adams Crossroads, Alabama, an unincorporated community in Cherokee County
Adams Crossroads, Delaware, an unincorporated community in Sussex County